R337 road may refer to:
 R337 road (Ireland)
 R337 road (South Africa)